Matthew Flinders Anglican College (MFAC) is an independent Anglican co-educational primary and secondary day school located in Buderim, approximately  north of Brisbane, on the Sunshine Coast of Queensland, Australia. Founded in 1990 and named in honour of Matthew Flinders, the college has grown from an enrolment of 160 students in its foundation year, to over 1,300 students in 2015.

Overview 
The school's Overall Position and NAPLAN results have seen Flinders named in local, state and national media as one of the top 100 schools in Australia, top 10 schools in Queensland and highest-achieving school in the Sunshine Coast.

Music 
The music department has two orchestral rehearsal rooms, a computer lab, eight solo to quartet practise rooms, a locker room, a lendable instrumental storage room and department office. There are five class music teachers and 24 private instrumental teachers. In year 3, students learn to play the recorder, and in year 4 are given a choice of violin, viola or cello. The annual school production alternates between a musical and series of age-segregated one-act plays, both of which are (as of 2012) staged in the college's 600-seat performance centre, as is the year 6 (formerly year 7) musical. The performance centre is also used to present concerts and recitals by touring artists. The school has ten musical groups, including three string orchestras, three choirs and four wind ensembles. Several independent, student-run ensembles also exist, including the saxophone, percussion, vocal quartets and flute ensemble.

Houses

The students are divided into four (primary) and eight (secondary) houses, each named after a notable Australian person:

References

External links
 

Anglican high schools in Queensland
Anglican primary schools in Queensland
Schools on the Sunshine Coast, Queensland
Buderim
Educational institutions established in 1990
1990 establishments in Australia